The year 1997 in film involved many significant films, including Titanic, The Full Monty, Gattaca, Donnie Brasco, Good Will Hunting, L.A. Confidential, The Fifth Element, Nil by Mouth, The Spanish Prisoner, and the beginning of the film studio DreamWorks.

Highest-grossing films

The top 10 films released in 1997 by worldwide gross are as follows:

Box office records
Titanic became the first movie in history to pass  at the box office on March 1, 1998. Titanic held the record for the highest-grossing movie of all time for 12 years until it was surpassed by Avatar on January 25, 2010.
It was the first time Sony Pictures topped the domestic box office, after Disney was the top-grossing domestic distributor for the previous three years.

Events
 The Star Wars Special Editions, a theatrical anniversary edition of the original Star Wars trilogy, celebrating the 20th anniversary of the release of Star Wars: Episode IV – A New Hope, are released.
 The Fifth Element is released, becoming a global box office success. It will go on to become the top-grossing French film of all time, a record it will hold for 14 years until the release of The Intouchables in 2011.
 Titanic becomes the first film to gross US$1 billion at the box office, making it the highest-grossing film in history until Avatar broke the record in 2010.
 The Lost World: Jurassic Park grosses a record $90,161,880 on Memorial Day Weekend.
Academy Awards

Golden Globe Awards

Palme d'Or (Cannes Film Festival):
Taste of Cherry (طعم گيلاس), directed by Abbas Kiarostami, Iran / France
The Eel (うなぎ), directed by Shohei Imamura, Japan

Golden Lion (Venice Film Festival):
Hana-bi (Fireworks), directed by Takeshi Kitano, Japan

Golden Bear (Berlin Film Festival):
The People vs. Larry Flynt, directed by Miloš Forman, Canada / United States

Award ceremonies
 2nd Empire Awards
 24th Saturn Awards

Awards

1997 wide-release movies

January–March

April–June

July–September

October–December

Notable films released in 1997
United States unless stated

A
 Absolute Power, directed by and starring Clint Eastwood, with Gene Hackman, Ed Harris, Laura Linney, Judy Davis, Dennis Haysbert, Scott Glenn, E. G. Marshall
 Addicted to Love, starring Meg Ryan and Matthew Broderick
 Air Bud, directed by Charles Martin Smith and starring Michael Jeter, Kevin Zegers, and Wendy Makkena
 Air Force One, directed by Wolfgang Petersen and starring Harrison Ford, Wendy Crewson, Glenn Close, Gary Oldman, Liesel Matthews and William H. Macy
 Airbag – (Spain)
 The Alarmist, starring David Arquette and Stanley Tucci
 Albino Alligator, directed by Kevin Spacey, starring Matt Dillon, Gary Sinise, Faye Dunaway, and Viggo Mortensen
 Alien Resurrection, starring Sigourney Weaver and Winona Ryder
 All Over Me, directed by Alex Sichel and starring Alison Folland, Tara Subkoff, Cole Hauser, and Wilson Cruz
 An American Werewolf in Paris, directed by Allen Waller and starring Tom Everett Scott and Julie Delphy
 American Vampire, starring Carmen Electra
 Amistad, directed by Steven Spielberg, starring Morgan Freeman, Anthony Hopkins, and Djimon Hounsou
 Anaconda, directed by Luis Llosa and starring Jennifer Lopez, Eric Stoltz, and Jon Voight
 Anastasia, directed by Don Bluth and Gary Goldman, and starring the voices of Meg Ryan, John Cusack, and Kelsey Grammer.
 Another Day in Paradise, directed by Larry Clark and starring Melanie Griffith, Natasha Gregson Wagner, Vincent Kartheiser, and James Woods
 The Apostle, directed by and starring Robert Duvall, with Miranda Richardson and Farrah Fawcett
 As Good as It Gets, directed by James L. Brooks, starring Jack Nicholson, Helen Hunt, and Greg Kinnear – Golden Globe Award for Best Picture (Musical or Comedy)
 The Assignment, directed by Christian Duguay and starring Aidan Quinn, Donald Sutherland and Ben Kingsley
 Austin Powers: International Man of Mystery, directed by Jay Roach and starring Mike Myers, Elizabeth Hurley, Mimi Rogers, and Michael York

B
 Bad Manners
 Bang
 Batman & Robin, directed by Joel Schumacher and starring George Clooney, Arnold Schwarzenegger, Chris O'Donnell, and Uma Thurman
 Bean, directed by Mel Smith, starring Rowan Atkinson – (UK)
 Bent, starring Clive Owen – (UK), rated NC-17
 Best Men, starring Dean Cain, Sean Patrick Flanery, Drew Barrymore, Fred Ward, and Andy Dick
 Beverly Hills Ninja, starring Chris Farley
 Blackrock, starring Heath Ledger – (Australia)
 Bliss
 Boogie Nights, directed by Paul Thomas Anderson, starring Mark Wahlberg, Burt Reynolds, Julianne Moore, Philip Seymour Hoffman, William H. Macy, John C. Reilly, and Don Cheadle
 Born Bad, starring Corey Feldman
 Booty Call, starring Jamie Foxx
 The Borrowers, starring John Goodman
 Le Bossu (The Hunchback), starring Daniel Auteuil – (France)
 The Boxer, directed by Jim Sheridan and starring Daniel Day-Lewis
 Breakdown, starring Kurt Russell, Kathleen Quinlan, J. T. Walsh
 Breaking Up, starring Russell Crowe and Salma Hayek
 Brother (Brat) – (Russia)
 Buddy, starring Rene Russo
 The Butcher Boy, directed by Neil Jordan and starring Eamonn Owens, Stephen Rea, and Sinead O'Connor (Ireland)
 Buud Yam – (Burkina Faso)

C
 The Call of the Wild: Dog of the Yukon (Canada)
 Campfire Tales
 Career Girls, directed by Mike Leigh – (UK)
 The Castle – (Australia)
 Cats Don't Dance, directed by Mark Dindal
 Character (Karakter) – (Netherlands/Belgium) – Academy Award for Best Foreign Language Film
 Chasing Amy, directed by Kevin Smith, starring Ben Affleck, Joey Lauren Adams, and Jason Lee
 Children of Heaven (بچه‌های آسمان), directed by Majid Majidi – (Iran) – first Iranian film to be nominated for an Oscar
 City of Industry, directed by John Sayles
 Clockwatchers, starring Toni Collette, Parker Posey, and Lisa Kudrow
 Commandments, starring Courteney Cox
 Con Air, directed by Simon West and starring John Cusack, Nicolas Cage, John Malkovich, and Steve Buscemi
 Conspiracy Theory, directed by Richard Donner, starring Mel Gibson and Julia Roberts
 Contact, directed by Robert Zemeckis, starring Jodie Foster, Matthew McConaughey, Tom Skerritt, James Woods, Angela Bassett, and John Hurt
 Cop Land, directed by James Mangold, starring Sylvester Stallone, Harvey Keitel, Ray Liotta, and Robert De Niro
 Crayola Kids Adventures: Tales of Gulliver's Travels
 Cube – (Canada)

D
 Dakan (Destiny) (Guinea)
 Dangerous Ground, starring Ice Cube and Elizabeth Hurley
 Dante's Peak, starring Pierce Brosnan, Linda Hamilton, and Charles Hallahan
 Deconstructing Harry, directed by and starring Woody Allen
 Def Jam's How to Be a Player
 Defying Gravity
 The Devil's Advocate, directed by Taylor Hackford and starring Keanu Reeves, Charlize Theron, and Al Pacino
 The Devil's Own, directed by Alan J. Pakula, starring Harrison Ford and Brad Pitt
 Different Strokes, starring Dana Plato and Bentley Mitchum
 Digging to China, directed by Timothy Hutton and starring Kevin Bacon and Evan Rachel Wood
 Dinner at Fred's, starring Gil Bellows, Parker Posey and Christopher Lloyd
 Dogtown, starring Mary Stuart Masterson, Natasha Gregson Wagner, Jon Favreau
 Donnie Brasco, directed by Mike Newell, starring Al Pacino and Johnny Depp
 Double Team, starring Jean-Claude Van Damme, Dennis Rodman, and Mickey Rourke
 Dream with the Fishes
 Driftwood, starring James Spader

E
 The Edge, starring Anthony Hopkins and Alec Baldwin
 Ed Mort – (Brazil)
 The Eel, directed by Shohei Imamura – (Japan) – Palme d'Or award
 The End of Evangelion – (Japan)
 Evangelion: Death and Rebirth – (Japan)
 Event Horizon, starring Laurence Fishburne
 Eve's Bayou, starring Lynn Whitfield and Samuel L. Jackson
 Excess Baggage, starring Alicia Silverstone and Benicio del Toro

F
 Face, starring Robert Carlyle and Ray Winstone – (UK)
 Face/Off, directed by John Woo, starring John Travolta and Nicolas Cage
 Fathers' Day, starring Robin Williams and Billy Crystal
 FernGully 2: The Magical Rescue
 Fever Pitch, starring Colin Firth – (UK)
 Fierce Creatures, starring John Cleese, Jamie Lee Curtis, Kevin Kline, Michael Palin – (UK/US)
 The Fifth Element, directed by Luc Besson, starring Bruce Willis, Gary Oldman, Milla Jovovich, Chris Tucker – (France)
 Fire Down Below, starring Steven Seagal
 ...First Do No Harm, starring Meryl Streep, Fred Ward
 First Time Felon, starring Omar Epps and Delroy Lindo
 Floating, starring Norman Reedus
 Flubber, directed by Les Mayfield, starring Robin Williams, Christopher McDonald, Clancy Brown, voices by Jodi Benson
 Fools Rush In, starring Salma Hayek and Matthew Perry
 For Richer or Poorer, starring Tim Allen and Kirstie Alley
 Free Willy 3: The Rescue, directed by Sam Pillsbury
 The Full Monty, directed by Peter Cattaneo and starring Robert Carlyle – (UK)
 Funny Games, directed by Michael Haneke – (Austria)

G
 G.I. Jane, starring Demi Moore and Anne Bancroft
 The Game, directed by David Fincher, starring Michael Douglas and Sean Penn
 Gang Related, starring James Belushi, Dennis Quaid, Tupac Shakur
 Gattaca, starring Ethan Hawke, Uma Thurman, Jude Law
 George of the Jungle, directed by Sam Weisman, starring Brendan Fraser, Leslie Mann, Thomas Haden Church, Richard Roundtree and John Cleese (voice only)
 Ghosts, a music short featuring Michael Jackson
 Glam, starring William McNamara, Natasha Gregson Wagner, Tony Danza, Jon Cryer – rated NC-17
 Gone Fishin', starring Joe Pesci and Danny Glover
 Good Burger, starring Kenan Thompson and Kel Mitchell
 Good Will Hunting, directed by Gus Van Sant, starring Robin Williams, Matt Damon, Minnie Driver, Ben Affleck
 Goodbye America – (Philippines/US)
 Gridlock'd, starring Tim Roth and Tupac Shakur
 Grind
 Grosse Pointe Blank, starring John Cusack, Minnie Driver, Dan Aykroyd

H
 Hacks, starring Stephen Rea, Illeana Douglas, John Ritter
 Hamam – (Italy/Spain/Turkey)
 Hana-bi (Fireworks), directed by and starring Takeshi Kitano – (Japan) – Golden Lion award
 Happy Together
 Heads or Tails, starring Roy Dupuis – (Canada)
 Heaven's Burning, starring Russell Crowe and Youki Kudoh – (Australia)
 Henry Fool, directed by Hal Hartley – winner of Best Screenplay Cannes Film Festival
 Hercules
 Highball, starring Justine Bateman
 Hold You Tight, directed by Stanley Kwan – (Hong Kong)
 Home Alone 3, starring Alex D. Linz and Scarlett Johansson
 Hoodlum, starring Laurence Fishburne
 The Hound
 The House of Yes. starring Parker Posey, Tori Spelling, Freddie Prinze Jr.
 Hugo Pool, starring Alyssa Milano, Patrick Dempsey, Robert Downey Jr.
 Hurricane Streets

I
 I Know What You Did Last Summer, starring Jennifer Love Hewitt, Sarah Michelle Gellar, Ryan Phillippe
 The Ice Storm, starring Kevin Kline, Joan Allen, Sigourney Weaver, Tobey Maguire
 In & Out, starring Kevin Kline, Joan Cusack, Tom Selleck, Matt Dillon, Bob Newhart
 In the Company of Men
 Incognito, starring Jason Patric
 Into Thin Air
 Inventing the Abbotts, starring Liv Tyler, Joaquin Phoenix, Billy Crudup, Jennifer Connelly

J
 The Jackal, starring Bruce Willis and Richard Gere
 Jack Frost
 Jackie Brown, directed by Quentin Tarantino, starring Samuel L. Jackson, Pam Grier, Bridget Fonda, Michael Keaton, Robert Forster, Robert De Niro
 Jackie Chan's First Strike – (Hong Kong)
 Joey – (Australia)
 Josh and the Big Wall!
 Joyride, starring Tobey Maguire and Benicio Del Toro
 Jungle 2 Jungle, starring Tim Allen
 Just Write, starring Jeremy Piven

K
 Keys to Tulsa
 Kini and Adams – (Burkina Faso)
 Kiss or Kill – (Australia)
 Kiss the Girls, starring Morgan Freeman and Ashley Judd
 Kiss & Tell, starring Heather Graham and Rose McGowan
 Kitchen Party – (Canada)
 Knockin' on Heaven's Door – (Germany)
 Kull the Conqueror
 Kundun, directed by Martin Scorsese

L
 L.A. Confidential, directed by Curtis Hanson, starring Kevin Spacey, Russell Crowe, Guy Pearce, Kim Basinger, Danny DeVito, James Cromwell
 Larry-Boy! And the Fib from Outer Space!
 The Last Time I Committed Suicide, starring Thomas Jane and Keanu Reeves
 Lawn Dogs, starring Sam Rockwell
 Leave It to Beaver, starring Christopher McDonald and Janine Turner
 Lewis and Clark and George
 Liar Liar, starring Jim Carrey
 Life Is Beautiful, directed by and starring Roberto Benigni – (Italy) – Academy Award for Best Foreign Language Film
 A Life Less Ordinary, starring Ewan McGregor and Cameron Diaz – (UK/US)
 Little Boy Blue, starring Ryan Phillippe and Nastassja Kinski
 Little City, starring Jon Bon Jovi
 Live Flesh, directed by Pedro Almodóvar, starring Javier Bardem – (Spain)
 The Locusts, starring Vince Vaughn and Ashley Judd
 Lolita, starring Jeremy Irons
 Lost Highway, directed by David Lynch, starring Bill Pullman and Patricia Arquette
 The Lost World: Jurassic Park, directed by Steven Spielberg, starring Jeff Goldblum and Julianne Moore
 Love and Death on Long Island, starring John Hurt – (Canada/UK)
 Love Jones
 Lovelife, starring Sherilyn Fenn and Carla Gugino
 The Lovemaster, starring  Craig Shoemaker, Courtney Thorne-Smith, George Wendt and Farrah Fawcett

M
 Ma vie en rose (My Life in Pink) – (Belgium) – Golden Globe Award for Best Foreign Language Film
 Mad City, starring Dustin Hoffman and John Travolta
 The Man Who Knew Too Little, starring Bill Murray
 Masterminds, starring Patrick Stewart
 The MatchMaker, starring Janeane Garofalo – (Ireland)
 Meet Wally Sparks, starring Rodney Dangerfield
 Men in Black, directed by Barry Sonnenfeld, starring Tommy Lee Jones and Will Smith
 Metro, starring Eddie Murphy
 Midnight in the Garden of Good and Evil, directed by Clint Eastwood, starring Kevin Spacey and John Cusack
 Mimic, starring Mira Sorvino
 Money Talks, starring Chris Tucker
 Mortal Kombat: Annihilation
 Most Wanted
 Mouse Hunt, starring Nathan Lane
 Mr. Magoo, starring Leslie Nielsen
 Mrs Brown, starring Judi Dench and Billy Connolly – (UK)
 Mrs. Dalloway, starring Vanessa Redgrave – (UK)
 Murder at 1600, starring Wesley Snipes
 My Best Friend's Wedding, starring Julia Roberts
 My Heart Is Mine Alone – (Germany)
 Myself in the Distant Future – (North Korea)

N
 Nevada, starring Amy Brenneman
 Niagara, Niagara
 The Night Flier, starring Miguel Ferrer
 Night of the Demons 3
 Nightwatch, starting Ewan McGregor, Josh Brolin, Nick Nolte
 Nil by Mouth, directed by Gary Oldman, starring Ray Winstone – (UK)
 Nothing to Lose, starring Martin Lawrence and Tim Robbins
 Nowhere

O
 Office Killer, starring Molly Ringwald
 The Old Lady and the Pigeons – (France)
 187, starring Samuel L. Jackson
 One Night Stand, starring Wesley Snipes
 Orgazmo starring Trey Parker, Matt Stone, Dian Bachar, rated NC-17
 Ossos (Portugal)
 Out to Sea, starring Walter Matthau and Jack Lemmon

P
 Paws, starring Billy Connolly, Heath Ledger – (Australia)
 The Peacekeeper, starring Dolph Lundgren, Montel Williams, Roy Scheider – (Canada)
 The Peacemaker, starring George Clooney and Nicole Kidman
 Perdita Durango, starring Javier Bardem and Rosie Perez – (Spain)
 Perfect Blue (Pâfekuto burû), starring Bridget Hoffman and Wendee Lee – (Japan)
 The Perfect Circle (Savršeni krug), directed by Ademir Kenović – (Bosnia and Herzogovina)
 Picture Perfect, starring Jennifer Aniston
 Pippi Longstocking – (Sweden)
 Playing God, starring David Duchovny
 Plump Fiction
 Poison Ivy: The New Seduction, starring Jaime Pressly
 The Postman, directed by and starring Kevin Costner
 Prefontaine, starring Jared Leto
 Pride Divide
 Princess Mononoke (Mononoke Hime) – (Japan)
 Private Parts, starring Howard Stern

Q
 Quiet Days in Hollywood, starring Hilary Swank, Chad Lowe, Natasha Gregson Wagner – (Germany)

R
 The Rage, starring Gary Busey, Lorenzo Lamas, Roy Scheider – (Canada/US)
 The Rainmaker, directed by Francis Coppola, starring Matt Damon, Danny DeVito, Claire Danes, Jon Voight
 The Real Blonde
 Red-Blooded American Girl II, starring Kari Wuhrer, Burt Young and David Keith – (Canada)
 Red Corner, starring Richard Gere
 Red Meat
 Regeneration, starring Jonathan Pryce – (UK)
 The Relic, starring Penelope Ann Miller
 Retroactive
 A River Made to Drown In
 Road to Nhill - (Australia)
 Robinson Crusoe, starring Pierce Brosnan
 RocketMan
 Romy and Michele's High School Reunion, starring Lisa Kudrow and Mira Sorvino
 Rosewood, directed by John Singleton, starring Ving Rhames

S
 The Saint, starring Val Kilmer
 Scream 2, starring Neve Campbell
 Selena, starring Jennifer Lopez
 Seven Years in Tibet, directed by Jean-Jacques Annaud, starring Brad Pitt – (US/UK)
 She's So Lovely, starring Sean Penn, Robin Wright Penn, John Travolta
 Shooting Fish – (UK)
 Six Ways to Sunday, starring Norman Reedus
 The Sixth Man, starring Marlon Wayans
 Slaves to the Underground
 The Soong Sisters, starring Maggie Cheung, Michelle Yeoh and Vivian Wu – (Hong Kong)
 Soul Food, starring Vanessa L. Williams and Vivica A. Fox
 Space Marines
 Spaceman
 The Spanish Prisoner, directed by David Mamet, starring Campbell Scott and Steve Martin
 Spawn, starring Michael Jai White, John Leguizamo, Frank Welker and Martin Sheen
 Speed 2: Cruise Control, starring Sandra Bullock
 Spice World, featuring the Spice Girls and Richard E. Grant – (UK/US)
 Stag
 Star Wars Trilogy (Special Edition)
 Starship Troopers, directed by Paul Verhoeven
 Steel, starring Shaquille O'Neal
 Still Breathing, starring Brendan Fraser and Joanna Going
 Strategic Command, starring Michael Dudikoff, Richard Norton and Bryan Cranston
 Strawberry Fields
 Suicide Kings, starring Christopher Walken
 Sunday
 Super Speedway
 The Sweet Hereafter, starring Ian Holm – (Canada)
 Switchback, starring Danny Glover and Dennis Quaid

T
 Taste of Cherry, directed by Abbas Kiarostami – (Iran) – Palme d'Or award
 Thank God He Met Lizzie, starring Cate Blanchett – (Australia)
 That Old Feeling, starring Bette Midler and Dennis Farina
 The Thief (vor) – (Russia)
 This World, Then the Fireworks, starring Billy Zane and Gina Gershon
 Time Under Fire
 Titanic, directed by James Cameron, starring Leonardo DiCaprio and Kate Winslet – Academy and Golden Globe (drama) Awards for Best Picture
 Tomorrow Never Dies, starring Pierce Brosnan (as James Bond), Michelle Yeoh, Teri Hatcher, Judi Dench – (UK)
 Trojan War, starring Jennifer Love Hewitt, Will Friedle, Danny Masterson
 Troublesome Night – (Hong Kong)
 Troublesome Night 2 – (Hong Kong)
 True Love and Chaos – (Australia)
 Turbo: A Power Rangers Movie
 Turbulence, starring Ray Liotta and Lauren Holly
 Twists of Terror (Canada)
 Two Girls and a Guy, starring Robert Downey Jr., Heather Graham, Natasha Gregson Wagner

U
 U Turn, directed by Oliver Stone, starring Sean Penn, Jennifer Lopez, Nick Nolte
 The Ugly – (New Zealand)
 Under the Lighthouse Dancing – (Australia)
 Ulee's Gold, starring Peter Fonda

V
 Vegas Vacation, starring Chevy Chase
 Volcano, starring Tommy Lee Jones

W
 Wag the Dog, directed by Barry Levinson, starring Robert De Niro and Dustin Hoffman
 Waiting for Guffman, directed by Christopher Guest
 Warriors of Virtue – (US/China)
 Welcome to Sarajevo, starring Woody Harrelson
 Welcome to Woop Woop – (Australia/US)
 The Wiggles Movie – (Australia)
 Wild America
 The Wings of the Dove, starring Helena Bonham Carter – (UK/US)
 Wishmaster
 The Wrong Guy, starring Dave Foley – (Canada)

Y
 Year of the Dogs – (Australia)
 Year of the Horse, a documentary film about Neil Young directed by Jim Jarmusch

Z
 Zeus and Roxanne, starring Steve Guttenberg and Kathleen Quinlan

Births
 January 21 - Jeremy Shada, American actor and musician
 January 24
 Jonah Bobo, American actor
 Dylan Riley Snyder, American actor
 February 2 - Ellie Bamber, English actress
 February 8
Kathryn Newton, American actress
Quintessa Swindell, American actor
 February 10 - Chloë Grace Moretz, American actress
 February 12 - Shane Baumel, American former teen actor
 February 14 - Madison Iseman, American actress
 February 23 - Pallavi Dey, Indian actress (d. 2022)
 February 25 - Isabelle Fuhrman, American actress
 March 2 - Becky G, American singer and actress
 March 3 - Camila Cabello, Cuban singer and actress
 March 6 - Alisha Boe, Norwegian-American actress
 March 9 - Niamh Wilson, Canadian actress
 March 10 - Madeleine Arthur, Canadian actress
 March 18 - Ciara Bravo, American actress
 March 28 - Annabelle Davis, English actress
 April 1 - Asa Butterfield, English actor
 April 5 - Henry Hunter Hall, American actor
 April 15 - Maisie Williams, English actress
 April 23 - Alex Ferris, Canadian actor
 April 26 - Amber Midthunder, American actress
 May 2 - Perla Haney-Jardine, Brazilian-American actress
 May 11 - Lana Condor, American actress
 May 12 - Odeya Rush, Israeli actress
 May 30 - Jake Short, American actor
 June 13 - Theodore Pellerin, Canadian actor 
 June 16 - Camila Morrone, American model and actress
 June 17 - KJ Apa, New Zealand actor
 June 18 - Max Records, American actor
 June 26 - Jacob Elordi, Australian actor
 July 13 - Leo Howard, American actor and martial artist
 July 18 - Fionn Whitehead, British actor
 July 22 - Field Cate, American actor
 August 5
 Olivia Holt, American actress and singer
 Adam Irigoyen, American actor
 August 13 - Yeo Jin-goo, South Korean actor
 August 18 - Josephine Langford, Australian actress
 August 25
Holly Gibbs, English child actress
Bryana Salaz, American actress and singer
 August 28 - Emilia McCarthy, Canadian actress
 August 30 - Dana Gaier, American actress
 September 7 - Dean-Charles Chapman, English actor
 September 12 - Sydney Sweeney, American actress
 September 16 - Elena Kampouris, American actress
 September 19 - Jayme Lawson, American actress
 October 6 - Honor Swinton Byrne, British actress
 October 7 - Kira Kosarin, American actress
 October 8 - Bella Thorne, American actress
 October 10 - Grace Rolek, American actress and voice actress
 October 23 - Zach Callison, American actor and voice actor
 October 28 - Sierra McCormick, American actress
 November 1
 Max Burkholder, American actor
 Alex Wolff, American actor and musician
 November 6 - Hero Fiennes Tiffin, English actor, model and producer
 November 8 - Dominique Thorne, American actress
 November 13 - Brent and Shane Kinsman, American twin child actors
 November 18 - Noah Ringer, American actor
 November 26
 Aubrey Joseph, American actor and rapper
 Luka Sabbat, American actor and model
 December 11
Ben Cook (actor), American actor, singer and dancer
Taylor Hickson, Canadian actress
 December 15 - Maude Apatow, American actress

Deaths

Film debuts 
Eric Bana – The Castle
Mischa Barton – Lawn Dogs
H. Jon Benjamin – Who's the Caboose?
Paul Bettany – Bent
Leslie Bibb – Private Parts
Jessica Biel – Ulee's Gold
Cate Blanchett – Paradise Road
Orlando Bloom – Wilde
Gerard Butler – Mrs. Brown
Linda Cardellini – Good Burger
John Cho – Shopping for Fangs
Jason Clarke – Dilemma
Stephen Colbert – Shock Asylum
James Corden – Twenty Four Seven
Chiwetel Ejiofor – Amistad
Shannon Elizabeth – Blast and Jack Frost
Mike Epps – Strays
Tom Felton – The Borrowers
Jennifer Garner – Deconstructing Harry and Mr. Magoo
Ioan Gruffudd – Wilde
Katie Holmes – The Ice Storm
Keegan-Michael Key – Get the Hell Out of Hamtown
Marc Maron – Who's the Caboose?
Eddie Marsan – The Man Who Knew Too Little
Kel Mitchell – Good Burger
Samantha Morton – This Is the Sea
Alessandro Nivola - Inventing the Abbotts
Nick Offerman – Going All the Way
Sarah Paulson – Levitation
Norman Reedus – Floating and Mimic
Matthew Rhys – House of America
Maya Rudolph – Gattaca
Amy Sedaris – Commandments
Sarah Silverman – Who's the Caboose?
Amy Smart – Campfire Tales and The Last Time I Committed Suicide
Mena Suvari – Nowhere
Dominique Swain – Lolita
Alan Tudyk – 35 Miles from Normal
Milo Ventimiglia – Boys Life 2
Olivia Williams – Gaston's War
Dean Winters – Conspiracy Theory
Evan Rachel Wood – Digging to China

References

 
Film by year